Norfolk and Western 611, also known as the "Spirit of Roanoke" and the "Queen of Steam", is a Norfolk and Western (N&W) class J 4-8-4 "Northern" streamlined steam locomotive built in May 1950 by the N&W's East End Shops in Roanoke, Virginia. It was one of the last mainline passenger steam locomotives built in the United States and represents the pinnacle of steam locomotive technology.

No. 611 was assigned to haul the N&W's premier passenger trains between Norfolk, Virginia, and Cincinnati, Ohio; and to ferry the Southern Railway's (SOU) passenger trains between Lynchburg, Virginia, and Bristol, Tennessee. In early 1956, it was involved in an accident and was subsequently repaired until its retirement from revenue service in 1959. Due to its excellent condition, the No. 611 locomotive was donated to the Virginia Museum of Transportation (VMT), where it sat on display as the sole survivor of the class J locomotives.

In 1982, No. 611 was restored to operation by the Norfolk Southern Railway (NS), N&W's successor. It became the main line star of the NS steam program, pulling excursion trains throughout the eastern United States. Former N&W president and NS chairman Robert B. Claytor, who was responsible for the restoration of No. 611, signifies the locomotive as Roanoke Born, Roanoke Bred, and Roanoke Proud. In 1984, No. 611 was dedicated as a National Historic Mechanical Engineering Landmark by the American Society of Mechanical Engineers (ASME). It was often invoked as an icon of Roanoke and its railroading history. In late 1994, when liability insurance costs led NS to end its steam program, the locomotive was again retired and moved back to the VMT.

In early 2013, the VMT helped raise $3.5 million to restore No. 611 to operating condition again. After a year of restoration work at the North Carolina Transportation Museum in Spencer, North Carolina, the locomotive returned to excursion service in mid-2015. In 2017, the Virginia General Assembly designated the 611 as the official state steam locomotive of Virginia. In 2019, 2021, and 2022, No. 611 visited the Strasburg Rail Road (SRC) in Strasburg, Pennsylvania, running short tourist excursion trains in the Pennsylvania Dutch countryside. As of 2023, it was temporarily put on display outside the Railroad Museum of Pennsylvania, which was located nearby the SRC.

History

Design origins, revenue service, and first retirement

At the outbreak of World War II in 1939, the Norfolk and Western Railway's (N&W) roster consisted of aging E class 4-6-2 Pacifics and K class 4-8-2 Mountains that could not handle the rising mainline passenger traffic over the Blue Ridge Mountains. N&W Mechanical Engineer H.W. Reynolds and his team developed a more powerful steam locomotive—the class J 4-8-4 Northern—and built 14 of them at the East End Shops in Roanoke, Virginia, between 1941 and 1950.

Their streamlined appearance was designed by N&W Tool Supervisor Franklin C. Noel; they were painted black with a Tuscan red stripe wrapped with golden yellow linings and letterings.

Because of their power and speed, the class Js were among the railroad's most reliable steam locomotives; they ran evenly on the mountainous and relatively short route of the N&W. Along with the articulated 2-6-6-4 class A and 2-8-8-2 Y6 freight locomotives, the class Js were part of N&W's Big Three steam locomotives and represented the pinnacle of steam locomotive technology. The last three Js in 1950 were also the last mainline passenger steam locomotives built in the United States. The N&W proclaimed the class J as the finest steam passenger locomotive ever built.

No. 611, the twelfth J class locomotive, was the first of the final batch of three. Completed at a cost of $251,544, it was put into revenue service on May 29, 1950. No. 611 and the other class Js were assigned to haul N&W's Powhatan Arrow, Pocahontas, and Cavalier passenger trains between Norfolk, Virginia, and Cincinnati, Ohio; and to ferry the Southern Railway's (SOU) Birmingham Special, Pelican and Tennessean between Lynchburg, Virginia, and Bristol, Tennessee. On September 24, 1952, No. 611 and sister locomotive No. 613 hauled the special train from Columbus, Ohio, to Kenova, West Virginia, for the presidential campaign of Dwight D. Eisenhower, who eventually won the election as president of the United States.

Under the management of N&W's new president Stuart T. Saunders in the late 1950s, the railroad began to dieselize, experimenting with first-generation diesel locomotives to understand their fuel and maintenance costs. They leased some EMD E6, E7, and E8 units from the Atlantic Coast Line (ACL) and Richmond, Fredericksburg and Potomac (RF&P) railroads, then ordered EMD GP9s to replace their class Js in passenger service.

The class Js continued in freight service until all except No. 611 were retired and scrapped between 1958 and 1959. In that latter year, No. 611 was selected to haul two Farewell To Steam round trip excursions: one from Petersburg, Virginia, to Norfolk on October 18 and the other from Roanoke to Williamson, West Virginia, on October 24. Three days later, No. 611 was retired from revenue service and served as a steam generator at the East End Shops, the same place where it was built, until its boiler flue ticket certificate expired in 1962. Because of the locomotive's excellent condition after being repaired from its 1956 accident, SOU board member W. Graham Claytor Jr. and N&W railroad photographer O. Winston Link convinced Saunders to donate No. 611 to the Roanoke Transportation Museum in Roanoke, where it sat on static display at the Wasena Park.

First excursion service and second retirement

On October 13, 1981, N&W president Robert B. Claytor announced that the No. 611 locomotive would join the SOU steam excursion program, which had started in 1966 by his brother Graham, who was then the SOU president. Three days later, No. 611 was removed from display and moved to the Roanoke Shops to be inspected and prepared for its trip to the restoration site. On October 22, the locomotive left Roanoke and was delivered to the SOU's Norris Yard Steam Shop in Irondale, Alabama, on October 25 where the restoration work began, which included the firebox sheets and the flues replaced. Many of No. 611's mechanical appliances such as the injectors, dynamo, and feedwater heater were rebuilt. Some new parts were fabricated, including the crosshead guide shoes from a pattern mold and the boiler staybolts from die casting. Two of the locomotive's left side rod bearings were refurbished by the Timken Roller Bearing Company. The locomotive's original Westinghouse 8-ET type brake system was replaced with the modern 26RL brake stand to allow easier repairs and replacement parts. The cab interior was sheathed with varnished hardwood. Additionally, the cab window frames were repainted in Tuscan red as opposed to the original N&W standard of orange frames.

On July 5, 1982, No. 611 was steamed up for the first time in 23 years. It took over excursion service from Southern No. 2716, which was retired for firebox problems. During that time, the N&W and SOU railroads merged to form the new Norfolk Southern Railway (NS), retaining the steam excursion program and doubling the trackage available for No. 611 to run on. Robert Claytor became the first chairman and chief executive officer (CEO) of NS; he would serve through 1986. After completing test runs from Irondale to Chattanooga, Tennessee, on August 15 and 16, 1982, No. 611 departed for Roanoke on August 20 with Robert Claytor as the engineer and his son Preston as the fireman in the cab. After some whistle stops in Anniston, Alabama; Atlanta, Georgia; and Salisbury, North Carolina, the locomotive arrived in Roanoke on August 22, where Claytor made a public speech in which he called No. 611 Roanoke Born, Roanoke Bred, and Roanoke Proud. 

On Labor Day weekend of 1982, No. 611 began its inaugural excursion run, pulling the Roanoke Chapter National Railway Historical Society (NRHS) Centennial Limited train to Norfolk, Virginia. The locomotive was to be turned on the Lambert's Point yard turntable for the return trip to Roanoke, but derailed on the sharply curved approach track. A pair of GE C30-7 diesel locomotives were called in to haul the return trip, while No. 611 was rerailed and towed to Roanoke to be repaired. On September 6, No. 611 made a one-way excursion trip from Roanoke to Alexandria, Virginia. A week later, the locomotive was filmed for a special National Geographic documentary, where it ran a private legislative excursion to White Sulphur Springs, West Virginia. On October 19, No. 611 went to Bluefield and Iaeger, West Virginia, where it was tested to be turned on the wyes in preparation for the round trip excursions from Roanoke to Bluefield and Iaeger on October 23, 24, and 30. On Thanksgiving weekend, No. 611 hauled its last 1982 excursion, which was called the Oyster Bowl Special and ran from Roanoke to Norfolk and back.

In 1983, No. 611 pulled more public and private excursion trips for the Norfolk Southern steam program including an NRHS excursion, where it double headed with Savannah and Atlanta 750 on RF&P trackage from Alexandria to Richmond, Virginia, on July 17. Afterwards, the locomotive hauled the longest one-way excursion trip from Richmond to the Midwest, where it ran some excursion trips out of Chicago and St. Louis, Missouri, on Chicago and North Western (CN&W), ex-Nickel Plate Road (NKP), and ex-Wabash (WAB) trackage. After the 1983 season, No. 611 went back to Irondale to have its firebox repaired and flues replaced before resuming excursion service in April 1984.

On May 19, 1984, the American Society of Mechanical Engineers (ASME) named No. 611 a National Historic Mechanical Engineering Landmark and presented a plaque to the Roanoke Transportation Museum. That August, the locomotive again ran excursions on ex-NKP trackage, double headed with Nickel Plate Road 765. On November 10 and 11, No. 611 visited Jacksonville, Florida, to haul the Suwanee Steam Special round-trip excursion from there to Valdosta, Georgia, for the North Florida Chapter NRHS.

During the Roanoke NRHS convention in August 1987, No. 611 pulled a round-trip excursion train from Roanoke to Radford, Virginia, where it ran side by side with the recently restored class A No. 1218, which was pulling an empty 50-hopper car train and later double-headed with No. 611 at Radford. In June 1989, No. 611 joined Nickel Plate Road 587 to haul the Roanoke NRHS Charter Independence Limited excursion trip from Cleveland, Ohio, to Roanoke, where the latter would join No. 1218 to make some excursion trips down in North Carolina the following month. On September 16, No. 611 ran two round-trip excursions from Roanoke to Radford and Lynchburg, Virginia, pulling a matching set of ten Tuscan red passenger cars, marking 40 years since the re-equipment of the Powhatan Arrow.

On November 3, 1991, during the Norfolk Southern steam program's 25th anniversary, No. 611 and No. 1218 teamed up with Southern Railway 4501 on a triple-header run-by, hauling a 28-car passenger excursion train from Chattanooga to Ooltewah, Tennessee, where the latter would take a few coaches for a complete round trip back to Chattanooga, turning around at Cleveland, Tennessee, while the two N&W steamers completed the rest of the trip to Atlanta, Georgia. Afterwards, No. 611's tender was upgraded with extended coal boards to expand the locomotive's range.

In late October 1992, No. 611 ran two round-trip excursions from Charlotte to Asheville, North Carolina. The first, on October 24, ran via the Old Fort Loops. The second, on the following day, brought 20 passenger cars over the Saluda Grade, the steepest standard-gauge main line railway grade in the United States. On the advice of NS Piedmont Division Superintendent Eugene Greene, the consist was split up at the bottom of the grade to prevent the couplers on the passenger cars from breaking while climbing the steepest part of Saluda Grade. Three assisting EMD SD40-2 diesel locomotives pulled the first 15 cars, while No. 611 pulled the last five. The latter briefly struggled and stalled for a few minutes, until it finally reached the top of the grade. The locomotives and cars were reassembled in the Saluda siding for the rest of the trip to Asheville and the return trip back to Charlotte. 

In July 1993, No. 611 pulled the NRHS Roanoke Chapter's 19th annual Independence Limited excursion, which arrived from Knoxville, Tennessee by SOU No. 4501 at Richlands, Virginia, bound for Fort Wayne, Indiana. Upon arrival in Fort Wayne, the excursion was transfer over to NKP Nos. 587 and 765, which took the train to Chicago for that year's NRHS Convention. Sometime after 1993, the No. 611 locomotive was added to the National Park Service's Historic American Engineering Record.

In June 1994, a year and a month after the death of Robert and Graham Claytor, respectively, No. 611 joined a double-header excursion run with Frisco 1522 for the annual NRHS convention in Atlanta. On September 28, 1994, a switching yard accident in Lynchburg, Virginia, damaged nine passenger cars, causing a shortage and the consequent need for more passenger cars. As a result, NS CEO David R. Goode decided to end the steam program due to rising insurance and maintenance costs, low spare system capacity, and delayed freight traffic.

On December 3, 1994, No. 611 hauled the last NS steam-powered excursion trip from Birmingham, Alabama, to Chattanooga and back. The next day, No. 611 set off to return to Roanoke, reaching there on December 7. That evening, upon arrival at Shaffer's Crossing in Roanoke, No. 611 had its fire put out for the final time in the 20th century.

After 12 years of excursion service with Norfolk Southern, No. 611 sat in storage at the East End Shops until October 7, 1995, when it was donated to the City of Roanoke, and put back on display at the Roanoke Transportation Museum (currently known as the Virginia Museum of Transportation (VMT) and located at the former N&W Roanoke freight station), where it sat underneath the Robert B. Claytor and W. Graham Claytor Jr. Pavilion shed. In June 2003, No. 611 was reunited with No. 1218, which was partially reassembled and cosmetically restored from its cancelled 1992-1996 overhaul.

In 2007, Nos. 611 and 1218 were both temporarily put on display at the East End Shops to commemorate its 125th anniversary. At that time, the former's original whistle, currently owned by Preston Claytor, was on loan to the Steam Railroading Institute in Owosso, Michigan, where it was used on the Pere Marquette 1225 steam locomotive. In 2011, the Roanoke City Council named No. 611 as The Spirit of Roanoke and the VMT had the name inscribed underneath both sides of the cab windows. On April 2, 2012, the City of Roanoke officially donated both the Nos. 611 and 1218 locomotives to the VMT.

Second excursion service

In 2011, NS CEO Wick Moorman brought back the steam program under the name 21st Century Steam, leading to speculation that No. 611, nicknamed the Queen of Steam, might be restored to operating condition once again. On February 22, 2013, VMT Executive Director Bev Fitzpatrick and the officials formed the Fire Up 611! committee to study the feasibility of returning No. 611 to active service. Members of the committee included some who had worked with No. 611 since the 1980s and 90s: chairman Preston Claytor, volunteer firewoman Cheri George, and Steam Operations Corporation president Scott Lindsay.

On June 2, 2013, the VMT and NS tested No. 611's roller bearings and determined that the locomotive was in excellent condition to be restored. On June 28, VMT officials launched the Fire Up 611! capital campaign. The group aimed to raise $3.5 million by the end of October to build a maintenance facility for the restoration, but raised just $2.5 million. Shortly after, Norfolk Southern donated $1.5 million of the proceeds from the auction of a Mark Rothko painting to the committee.

In March 2014, after raising money from nearly 3,000 donors all over the United States and 18 foreign countries, several key appointments were made by the Fire Up 611! committee to the locomotive's mechanical team, and a formal agreement was made with the North Carolina Transportation Museum (NCTM) in Spencer, North Carolina, to use the ex-Southern Railway Bob Julian roundhouse to restore No. 611.

On May 24, 2014, No. 611 was towed out of the VMT and moved to the NCTM the next day. At the Streamliners at Spencer event the following weekend, Moorman removed the first bolt from No. 611 and the restoration work began on June 2, 2014. The work was performed by the Steam Operations Corporation with the help of volunteers, including several from the Age of Steam Roundhouse in Sugarcreek, Ohio. By July 1, the locomotive had been completely disassembled. The restoration work included installing new flues, boiler work, repairs to the locomotive's trucks, tender, superheaters, boiler staybolts, running gear, and air brakes. It met the Federal Railroad Administration's (FRA) current safety guidelines and certification requirements.

On February 23, 2015, No. 611's boiler passed a hydrostatic test; it was test-fired on March 31. The locomotive was then reassembled and repainted with paint donated from Axalta. On May 9, No. 611 moved under its own power for the first time in nearly 21 years. On May 15, Claytor resign his position to protest the VMT board's decision to engrave No. 611 with the words "The Spirit of Roanoke"; he was replaced by executive search consultant Jim Stump. On May 21, the No. 611 locomotive completed a round-trip main line test run from Spencer to Greensboro, North Carolina. On May 28, the NCTM held photo runbys with No. 611 leading passenger and freight consists, plus night photo session.

On May 30, 2015, No. 611 began its homecoming trip back to Roanoke with now former NS CEO Moorman at the throttle. The next day, the No. 611 locomotive was reunited with the static display class A No. 1218 and class Y6a No. 2156, which was on loan from the National Museum of Transportation in St. Louis to be on display at the VMT until 2020.

The locomotive ran several round-trip excursions in Virginia for the 21st Century Steam program during the summer of 2015, such as The American from Manassas to Front Royal on June 6 and 7, The Cavalier from Lynchburg to Petersburg on June 13 and 14, The Powhatan Arrow from Roanoke to Lynchburg and The Pelican from Roanoke to Radford on July 3, 4, and 5. Then NS ended their 21st Century Steam program, although the No. 611 locomotive continued to pull various excursion trips over NS trackage.

During 2016, No. 611 received new front leading wheels and axles made by the Brenco Product Engineering. Afterwards, the locomotive ran two round-trip excursions in partnership with the NCTM: The Virginian from Spencer to Lynchburg on April 9 and the sold-out Blue Ridge Special from Spencer to Asheville the next day. On April 11, No. 611 partook in another NCTM photo charter runby along with Lehigh Valley Coal Company (LVCC) No. 126. On April 23 and 24, the locomotive ran The Roanoker round-trip excursion from Greensboro to Roanoke via Altavista, Virginia, on ex-Virginian Railway (VGN) main line. From mid May to early June, the No. 611 locomotive reran the previous year's Powhatan Arrow, Pelican, and American round-trip excursions. Afterwards, it went back to the NCTM for the summer events of cab rides, caboose rides, in-cab experiences, whistle-blowing, and short passenger train rides around the museum. On August 8, No. 611 returned to Roanoke under its own power to be on display at the VMT. On Labor Day weekend, it was steamed up again for the VMT events of cab tours and photo sessions with N&W GP9 No. 521. On September 7, No. 611 returned to the NCTM again for more events of cab rides, caboose rides, and in-cab experiences before returning to Roanoke on October 24.

On January 6, 2017, the No. 611 locomotive returned to the NCTM for its annual FRA inspection. On April 8, it ran The Virginian round-trip excursion and the next day's Charlotte Special round-trip excursion from Spencer to Charlotte in the morning and a second round-trip excursion, The Piedmont Limited from Spencer to Greensboro in the afternoon for the NCTM. Afterwards, No. 611 took part in NCTM's 100 Years of American Steam event, which marked the unveiling of the restored Texas 4-4-0 steam locomotive. After the event, No. 611 reran the two round-trip excursions; The Roanoker from Greensboro to Roanoke on April 22 and 23 and The Cavalier from Lynchburg to Petersburg on May 6 and 7. On May 23, the Virginia General Assembly officially named No. 611 as the Official Steam Locomotive of Virginia. On Memorial Day weekend, No. 611 ran its final main line round-trip excursions out of Roanoke; The Powhatan Arrow to Lynchburg and The Pocahontas to Radford. These were the last contributions of VMT Executive Director Bev Fitzpatrick before he retired at the end of 2017.

In 2018, No. 611 was unable to perform any main line excursions due to new restrictions on private charter trips, which were imposed by Amtrak CEO Richard Anderson. However, the VMT sent No. 611 to visit the NCTM for its annual FRA routine maintenance, as well as more events of cab rides, caboose rides, in-cab experiences, whistle-blowing, and short passenger train rides around the museum. The VMT also sought donations to add Positive train control (PTC) to No. 611.

In 2019, the VMT sent No. 611 to the Strasburg Rail Road (SRC) in Strasburg, Pennsylvania, for the five-weekend "N&W Reunion of Steam" events from September 27 to October 27. Lacking both the PTC and cab signalling system, No. 611 was paired behind a diesel locomotive for the trip to Strasburg. Upon arrival, No. 611 joined another N&W steam locomotive, 4-8-0 No. 475, the first time since 1991 that two ex-N&W steam locomotives operated side by side. After the events, the No. 611 locomotive returned to the NCTM for the first November weekend of in-cab experiences and caboose rides.

In 2020, No. 611 was restricted to static display at the NCTM by the COVID-19 pandemic, but was steamed up for more in-cab experiences, cab rides, and caboose rides events during the autumn season. During 2021, the locomotive returned to SRC for weekends of excursions, in-cab experiences, cab tours, hostling tours, and whistle-blowing during late May to early October. Afterwards, the No. 611 locomotive went into the SRC workshops for its annual FRA inspection and maintenance to its boiler staybolts.

In autumn of 2022, No. 611 participated in more SRC events of in-cab experiences on September 30-October 2, cab tours on October 7–9, photo charters on November 9–10, and excursion rides on November 11-13. On January 31, 2023, the No. 611 locomotive was put on temporary outdoor display through late spring at the Railroad Museum of Pennsylvania, which was located nearby the SRC.

Accidents
 On June 20, 1953, No. 611 was pulling The Cavalier when it struck a bakery truck at a railroad crossing in Chattaroy, West Virginia, injuring the truck driver. 
 Four days later, No. 611 was involved in another crossing accident at South Point, Ohio, where it hit the end of a tractor-trailer truck while pulling the eastbound Powhatan Arrow, denting its bullet nose and crushing its front footstep on the fireman's side. It was repaired shortly afterwards.
 On January 23, 1956, No. 611 was pulling the late westbound Pocahontas when it derailed while traveling at  around a  curved track along the Tug River near Cedar, West Virginia. The locomotive fell down the embankment of the Tug River and flipped onto its side. The engineer, Walter B. Willard was killed, while fireman Ernest W. Hoback, seven other crew members, and 51 passengers were injured. No. 611 received cosmetic damage, but was repaired and continued revenue service for another three years. The dents on its tender remained until they were removed during the locomotive's 2014-15 restoration.
Two of the passenger cars struck a faulty switch on the main line through the Great Dismal Swamp in Suffolk, Virginia, causing them and 12 other passenger cars to derail, although the locomotive, the first six cars, and last two cars stayed on the rails. The excursion consist contained heavyweight and open-air passenger cars that lacked tightlock couplers. 177 of the 1,000 employees and their family members were injured; 19 people were seriously injured and had to be airlifted to hospitals in nearby Norfolk for treatment. 11 of the derailed passenger cars were repaired. The two damaged open-air cars, the Missionary Ridge and Queen and Crescent Club, were scrapped and another, the W. Graham Claytor, Jr., was donated to the Virginia Museum of Transportation. The heavyweight passenger cars and open-air cars were retired from main line excursion service since it was too difficult and expensive for them to be retrofitted with tightlock couplers.

In popular culture
No. 611 starred in the 1983 promotional documentary video, Going Home, produced by Norfolk Southern and featuring the locomotive's first restoration and homecoming trip to Roanoke in 1982. The Ballad of the 611 song, written by the David Niblock Band, can be heard in the documentary. 
No. 611 was depicted on the Commonwealth of Virginia's Railway Heritage license plate.
No. 611 was featured in the 2015 children's book, Dash Dupree and the Queen of Steam.
No. 611 was featured in the 2016 feature-length documentary 611: American Icon, which chronicles the history of the locomotive.

See also
Atlantic Coast Line 1504
Baltimore and Ohio 4500
Milwaukee Road 261
Nashville, Chattanooga and St. Louis 576
Reading and Northern 2102
Santa Fe 2926
Southern Pacific 4449
Union Pacific 844

Notes

References

Bibliography

External links

N&W Class J 611 - Trains
Norfolk & Western J Class #611 - Virginia Museum of Transportation

4-8-4 locomotives
0611
Passenger locomotives
Railway locomotives introduced in 1950
Roanoke, Virginia
Standard gauge locomotives of the United States
Steam locomotives of the United States
Streamlined steam locomotives
Individual locomotives of the United States
History of Virginia
Preserved steam locomotives of Virginia
Historic American Engineering Record in Alabama
Historic Mechanical Engineering Landmarks